Julia Yevgenyevna Mikhalkova (born July 12, 1983, Verkhnyaya Pyshma) is a Russian actress and TV presenter.

Biography 
Born July 12, 1983 in the town of Verkhnyaya Pyshma, Sverdlovsk Oblast. She studied at the secondary school number 2. While still a student in grade 10 school, Julia began working on a local TV station in the position of a leading youth news. After high school, she entered the Faculty of the Ural State Pedagogical University, Yekaterinburg (specialty - a teacher of Russian language and literature). From the first course Julia became a member of the university KVN team, which participated in the Premier League. After two years of study at the Pedagogical University he entered the Yekaterinburg State Theater Institute (specialty - Actress Drama Theater, Film and Television), where she graduated in 2008.

In 2005, the program has become the leading programs on 'Fourth Channel' Yekaterinburg TV, later began to lead the forecast. Since 2009   the actress comedy show Ural Dumplings on STS channel.

In 2016, she put forward her candidacy for the primaries vote of United Russia to participate in the elections of deputies of the State Duma, following which she took third place.

She was invited to the Kremlin for the inauguration of President of the Russian Federation Vladimir Putin on May 7, 2018.

In 2022 Mikhalkova supported Russian invasion of Ukraine.

Filmography

References

External links

 Профиль Юлии Михалковой-Матюхиной на сайте «Уральских пельменей»

1983 births
Living people
Russian film actresses
Russian television actresses
21st-century Russian actresses
People from Verkhnyaya Pyshma
Russian television presenters
Russian women comedians
Russian women television presenters